Nauna is an Oceanic language spoken in the single village of Nauna on Nauna Island in Rapatona Rural LLG, Manus Province, Papua New Guinea.

References

External links 
 Audio recordings and written materials on Nauna are available through Kaipuleohone

Admiralty Islands languages
Languages of Manus Province
Severely endangered languages